A macrobiotic diet (or macrobiotics) is a fad diet based on ideas about types of food drawn from Zen Buddhism. The diet tries to balance the supposed yin and yang elements of food and cookware. Major principles of macrobiotic diets are to reduce animal products, eat locally grown foods that are in season, and consume meals in moderation.

There is no high-quality clinical evidence that a macrobiotic diet is helpful for people with cancer or other diseases, and it may be harmful.  Neither the American Cancer Society nor Cancer Research UK recommends adopting the diet.

Conceptual basis 

The macrobiotic diet is associated with Zen Buddhism and is based on the idea of balancing yin and yang. The diet proposes ten plans which are followed to reach a supposedly ideal yin:yang ratio of 5:1. The diet was popularized by George Ohsawa in the 1930s and subsequently elaborated on by his disciple Michio Kushi. Medical historian Barbara Clow writes that, in common with many other types of quackery, macrobiotics takes a view of illness and of therapy which conflicts with mainstream medicine.

Macrobiotics emphasizes locally grown whole grain cereals, pulses (legumes), vegetables, edible seaweed, fermented soy products, and fruit combined into meals according to the ancient Chinese principle of balance known as yin and yang. Whole grains and whole-grain products such as brown rice and buckwheat pasta (soba), a variety of cooked and raw vegetables, beans and bean products, mild natural seasonings, fish, nuts and seeds, mild (non-stimulating) beverages such as bancha twig tea, and fruit are recommended.

Some macrobiotic proponents stress that yin and yang are relative qualities that can only be determined in a comparison. All food is considered to have both properties, with one dominating. Foods with yang qualities are considered compact, dense, heavy, and hot, whereas those with yin qualities are considered expansive, light, cold, and diffuse. However, these terms are relative; "yangness" or "yinness" is only discussed in relation to other foods.

Brown rice and other whole grains such as barley, millet, oats, quinoa, spelt, rye, and teff are considered by macrobiotics to be the foods in which yin and yang are closest to being in balance. Therefore, lists of macrobiotic foods that determine a food as yin or yang generally compare them to whole grains.

Nightshade vegetables, including tomatoes, peppers, potatoes, and eggplant; also, spinach, beets, and avocados, are not recommended or are used sparingly in macrobiotic cooking, as they are considered extremely yin. Some macrobiotic practitioners also discourage the use of nightshades because of the alkaloid solanine which is thought to affect calcium balance. Some proponents of a macrobiotic diet believe that nightshade vegetables can cause inflammation and osteoporosis.

Practices

Food 

Some general guidelines for the Japanese-style macrobiotic diet are the following (it is also said that a macrobiotic diet varies greatly, depending on geographical and life circumstances):

 Well-chewed whole cereal grains, especially brown rice: 40–60%
 Vegetables: 25–30%
 Beans and legumes: 5–10%
 Miso soup: 5%
 Sea vegetables: 5%
 Traditionally or naturally processed foods: 5–10%

Fish and seafood, seeds and nuts, seed and nut butters, seasonings, sweeteners, fruits, and beverages may be enjoyed occasionally, two to three times per week. Other naturally-raised animal products may be included if needed during dietary transition or according to individual needs.

Kitchenware 
Cooking utensils should be made from certain materials such as wood or glass, while some materials including plastic, copper, and non-stick coatings are to be avoided. Electric ovens should not be used.

Japanese popularity and influence
The macrobiotic way of eating was developed and popularized by the Japanese. During the Edo period in Japan peasants had a diet based on staples of rice and soybeans. According to some macrobiotic advocates, a majority of the world population in the past ate a diet based primarily on grains, vegetables, and other plants. Because the macrobiotic diet was developed in Japan, Japanese foods that are thought to be beneficial for health are incorporated by most modern macrobiotic eaters.

Cancer

The American Cancer Society recommends "low-fat, high-fiber diets that consist mainly of plant products"; however, they urge people with cancer not to rely on a dietary program as an exclusive or primary means of treatment. Cancer Research UK states, "some people think living a macrobiotic lifestyle may help them to fight their cancer and lead to a cure. But there is no scientific evidence to prove this."

Nutritionist Fredrick J. Stare has commented that "there is no scientific evidence that macrobiotic diets can be helpful for cancer or any other disease."

Nutrition 
The macrobiotic diet is a type of fad diet. Most macrobiotic diets are not nutritionally sound.

Fish provides vitamin B12 in a macrobiotic diet, as bioavailable B12 analogues have not been established in any natural plant food, including sea vegetables, soya, fermented products, and algae. Although plant-derived foods do not naturally contain B12, some are fortified during processing with added B12 and other nutrients. Vitamin A, as its precursor beta-carotene, is available from plants such as carrots and spinach. Adequate protein is available from grains, nuts, seeds, beans, and bean products. Sources of Omega-3 fatty acids are discussed in the relevant article, and include soy products, walnuts, flax seeds, pumpkin seeds, hemp seeds, and fatty fish. Riboflavin along with most other B vitamins are abundant in whole grains. Iron in the form of non-heme iron in beans, sea vegetables and leafy greens is sufficient for good health; detailed information is in the USDA database.

Safety

Regulation
Macrobiotic practitioners are not regulated, and need not have any qualification or training in the United Kingdom.

Complications
One of the earlier versions of the macrobiotic diet that involved eating only brown rice and water has been linked to severe nutritional deficiencies and even death. Strict macrobiotic diets that include no animal products may result in nutritional deficiencies unless they are carefully planned. The danger may be worse for people with cancer, who may have to contend with unwanted weight loss and often have increased nutritional and caloric requirements. Relying on this type of treatment alone and avoiding or delaying conventional medical care for cancer may have serious health consequences.

Children
Children may also be particularly prone to nutritional deficiencies resulting from a macrobiotic diet.

Pregnancy
Macrobiotic diets have not been tested in women who are pregnant or breast-feeding, and the most extreme versions may not include enough of certain nutrients for normal fetal growth.

See also 

 Ch'i
 Chinese food therapy
 List of diets
 List of unproven and disproven cancer treatments
 Sanpaku
 Shiatsu
 Traditional Chinese medicine

References 

Pseudoscience
Fad diets
Alternative medicine
Semi-vegetarianism